Events from the year 1730 in Denmark.

Incumbents
 Monarch – Frederick IV (until 12 October), Christian VI
 Grand Chancellor – Ulrik Adolf Holstein (until 17 October)
 Prime Minister – Iver Rosenkrantz (from 17 October)

Events

 12 October – Christian VI becomes King of Denmark and Norway
 Adam Gottlob Moltke was made chamberlain to crown prince Frederick, later King Frederick V.
 26 October  Cron Printz Christian departs from Copenhagen, bound for Canton. It is the first Danish expedition to China. She wull arrive back in Copenhagen on 27 June 1732.

Births
 Caroline von Schimmelmann, Danish countess (d. 1795)

Deaths
 7 January – Árni Magnússon, Icelandic scholar (born 1663 in Iceland)
 12 October – Frederick IV, King of Denmark (born 1671)

References

 
1730s in Denmark
Denmark
Years of the 18th century in Denmark